Taxi is an American sitcom that originally aired on ABC from September 12, 1978, to May 6, 1982, and on NBC from September 30, 1982, to June 15, 1983. The series won 18 Emmy Awards, including three for Outstanding Comedy Series.  It focuses on the everyday lives of a handful of New York City taxi drivers and their abusive dispatcher. Taxi was produced by the John Charles Walters Company, in association with Paramount Network Television, and was created by James L. Brooks, Stan Daniels, David Davis, and Ed. Weinberger.

For most of the run of the show, the ensemble cast consisted of taxi drivers Alex Reiger (Judd Hirsch), Bobby Wheeler (Jeff Conaway), Elaine Nardo (Marilu Henner), Tony Banta (Tony Danza), and "Reverend" Jim Ignatowski (Christopher Lloyd), along with their dispatcher Louie De Palma (Danny DeVito) and mechanic Latka Gravas (Andy Kaufman).

The show was a critical and commercial success, having been nominated for 31 Emmy Awards and winning 13, including three straight years winning Outstanding Comedy. It has remained in syndicated reruns ever since the series ended.

Premise and themes
The show focuses on the employees who work the night shift of the fictional Sunshine Cab Company, and its principal setting is the company's fleet garage in Manhattan. Among the drivers, only Alex Reiger, who is disillusioned with life, considers cab driving his profession. The others view it as a temporary job.

Elaine Nardo is a single mother working as a receptionist at an art gallery. Tony Banta is a boxer with a losing record. Bobby Wheeler is a struggling actor. John Burns (written out of the show after the first season) is working his way through college. All take pity on "Reverend Jim" Ignatowski, an aging hippie minister, who is burnt out from drugs, so they help him become a cabbie. The characters also include Latka Gravas, their innocent, wide-eyed mechanic from an unnamed foreign country, and Louie De Palma, the despotic dispatcher.

A number of episodes involve a character having an opportunity to realize his dream to move up in the world, only to see it yanked away. Otherwise, the cabbies deal on a daily basis with their unsatisfying lives and with Louie's abusive behavior and contempt (despite being a former cab driver himself). Louie's assistant, Jeff Bennett, is rarely heard from at first, but his role increases in later seasons.

Despite the humor of the show, Taxi often tackles such dramatic life issues as drug addiction, single parenthood, blindness, obesity, dissociative identity disorder, animal abuse, homosexuality, racism, teenage runaways, divorce, nuclear war, sexual harassment, premenstrual mood disorders, gambling addiction, and grief.

Cast and characters

Main

 Alex Reiger (Judd Hirsch) – Alex is the main protagonist in the sitcom, the compassionate, level-headed core of the show; the one everyone else turns to for advice. At one point, he reveals his anxiety with this unwanted burden. He once worked in an office, with a good chance of advancement, but lost this job owing to his refusal to follow the company line. He was married to Phyllis Bornstein (Louise Lasser), and when she divorced him because of his lack of ambition she sought sole custody of their baby daughter, Cathy (Talia Balsam). He gave in rather than fight it. He is estranged from his lothario father, Joe (Jack Gilford), but has a closer relationship with his sister, Charlotte (Joan Hackett). Alex is a recovered compulsive gambler, although he relapses in one episode. A deadpan cynic, he has resigned himself to driving a cab for the rest of his life. 
 Robert L. "Bobby" Wheeler (Jeff Conaway) (1978–1981, recurring 1981–1982) – Bobby is an optimistically naive, struggling actor whose flamboyance is Louie's favorite target. Robin Williams was considered for the role, but he was already committed to Mork & Mindy. Success as an actor eludes Bobby. He is signed by a famous manager, but it turns out she only wants him as a lover, not a client. Later he is cast in the pilot for a soap opera, but his part is recast when the series goes into production. Conaway left the show at the beginning of Season 4, returning for a guest appearance in which his character leaves the taxi company for good. Writer Sam Simon explained later that when Conaway was absent for an episode, his dialogue was successfully reassigned to other cast members, which made the producers realize that he was expendable.
 Louie De Palma (Danny DeVito) – Louie is the main antagonist of the sitcom. The head dispatcher of the Sunshine Cab Company, Louie spends his time holding court inside the caged-in dispatch office at the garage, arguing with, belittling and bullying the drivers. He not only lacks morals, he is openly proud of his misdemeanors and outright crimes. Louie will do anything to benefit himself, from taking advantage of a drunken friend of his on, off girlfriend Zena Sherman (played by DeVito's real-life wife Rhea Perlman), to gambling with a young boy, to stealing from the company, to even spying on Elaine while she is changing, which he almost got fired over. He lives with his mother (DeVito's real mother, Julia, in two episodes). On some occasions he helps his workers, as in the episode in which a cruel hairstylist (played by Ted Danson) gives Elaine a garish makeover just before a very important event, it is Louie who bolsters her confidence to confront him. Louie is very superstitious, in one episode exhibiting great concern when Jim has a premonition that Alex is going to die later that night. In 1999, TV Guide ranked De Palma first on its list of the 50 greatest TV characters of all time.
 Elaine O'Connor Nardo (Marilu Henner) – Elaine is a divorced mother of two, struggling to cope while trying to realize her ambitions in the field of fine art. Louie's object of lust, she is attracted to characters played by actors ranging from Tom Selleck to Wallace Shawn. The last name for the character was taken from Patricia Nardo, a scriptwriter, former secretary, and close friend of Taxi co-creator James L. Brooks.
 Anthony Mark "Tony" Banta (Tony Danza) – The kind-hearted, slow-witted Vietnam veteran and boxer has little success in the sport (in one episode Banta gives his record as 8 wins, 24 losses and he has been knocked out 14 times). In fact, Louie makes a lot of money betting against him (when Banta makes a conscious decision to throw a fight, Louie decides to bet on Banta because the only way Banta can remain a loser in such a situation is to win). Finally, the boxing commission takes away his license because he has been knocked out one too many times. In the final season, Tony is introduced to new girlfriend Vicki (Anne De Salvo) by Simka. He and Vicki have a falling out after she becomes pregnant by him, but reconcile and get married. The last name for the character was taken from Gloria Banta, a scriptwriter and close friend of Taxi co-creator James L. Brooks.
 Reverend Jim Ignatowski (Christopher Lloyd) (guest star 1978, main cast 1979–1983) – A washed-up figure of the 1960s, Jim lives in a world of his own. He was once a diligent, mature student at Harvard University, with an extremely wealthy father (Victor Buono), but one bite of a drug-laden brownie was enough to get him hooked and send him into a downward spiral. His real last name had been Caldwell; he changed it to Ignatowski, thinking that the backward pronunciation of that name was "Star Child". In a particularly memorable episode, the cabbies help him pass a written exam to become one of them. He occasionally exhibits unexpected talents, such as the ability to play the piano masterfully (much to his own surprise). TV Guide placed Ignatowski 32nd on its list of the 50 greatest TV characters.
 Latka Gravas (Andy Kaufman) – Latka is an immigrant from a strange foreign land, often speaking in his foreign tongue (actually gibberish, often with invented phrases such as "ibi da" or "nik nik"), but when speaking English he speaks with a very heavy accent. He works as a mechanic, fixing the taxis. Latka was an adaptation of Kaufman's "Foreign Man" character, which he originated in his stage act. In this act, "Foreign Man" claimed to be from the fictional island of Caspiar in the Caspian Sea. Kaufman, feeling that he had lost creative control over the character he had created, eventually grew tired of the gag, leading the writers to give Latka multiple personality disorder. This allowed Kaufman to play other characters, the most frequent being a repellent, smooth-talking lounge-lizard persona calling himself Vic Ferrari. In one episode, Latka becomes Alex, with profound insights into "his" life. Just as he is about to reveal to the real Alex the perfect solution for all his problems, he reverts to Latka.
 Simka Dahblitz-Gravas (Carol Kane) (recurring 1980–1982, starring 1982–1983) – She is from the same country as Latka. They belong to different ethnic groups which traditionally detest each other, but they fall in love and eventually marry. She is much more assertive than her husband, often standing up to Louie on his behalf. 
 John Burns (Randall Carver) (1978–1979) – The naive young man works as a cabbie to pay for college, where he is working towards a degree in forestry. According to Carver, "the characters of John Burns and Tony Banta were too similar... some of the lines were almost interchangeable", so he was dropped after the first season without explanation. The premiere episode, "Like Father, Like Daughter", established that John started working for the cab company after he was a passenger in Alex's cab. John did not have change, so he had to ride with Alex to the garage to pay him. Once there, he started hanging around and eventually applied for a job. In the episode "The Great Line", he spontaneously marries a woman named Suzanne.

Recurring

 Jeff Bennett (J. Alan Thomas), Sunshine Cab's assistant dispatcher, he shares the "cage" with Louie but rarely speaks or interacts with the other characters. A quiet African-American man with an afro, Jeff appears throughout the show's run, initially as a bit part player and/or background performer. As the series progresses, Jeff gradually becomes more of a featured supporting player; his evolution culminates in a storyline in the Season 5 episode "Crime and Punishment", in which Louie falsely accuses Jeff of stealing car parts from the company and selling them on the black market—a crime which Louie himself committed. Thomas appeared as himself in the 1999 film Man on the Moon.
 Tommy Jeffries (T.J. Castronova), the bartender and waiter at Mario's, the restaurant where the group often hangs out. Tommy is pretty friendly with the whole gang, taking an interest in their personal lives.
 Joe Reiger (Jack Gilford) (1979–1981), Alex's father, from whom he is estranged. In his first appearance, he suffers a heart attack and Alex is convinced by his sister Charlotte (Joan Hackett) to visit him in the hospital. Alex and Joe had not spoken in 30 years, and Alex mistakes another patient for Joe.
 Zena Sherman (Rhea Perlman) (1979–1982). She has a romantic relationship with Louie (played by Perlman's real-life husband DeVito), but marries someone else after they break up.
 Greta Gravas (Susan Kellermann) (1979–1982), Latka's mother. She has a short fling with Alex, which causes friction with Latka.
 Phyllis Bornstein-Consuelos (Louise Lasser) (1980–1982), Alex's ex-wife, with whom he had a daughter. Phyllis became fed up with his lack of ambition and remarried, but they remain strongly attracted to each other. She once goes out on a date with Louie, to frustrate Alex.
 Cathy (Talia Balsam) (1978–1980), Phyllis and Alex's daughter. In the first episode of the series, Alex finds out that Cathy, who was a baby when he and Phyllis divorced, is making a stopover in Miami on her way to attend college in Portugal. He drives to Miami to meet her for the first time since then. In a later episode, he attends Cathy's wedding.
 Brian Sims (Marc Anthony Danza). In his first appearance, Tony fights a former boxing champ whose best days are behind him. He becomes troubled when he realizes that the champ is dedicating the fight to wheelchair user Brian (played by his real-life son, Marc Anthony Danza). In a next-season episode, Tony seeks to adopt him.

Guests

Among the many guest stars, Ruth Gordon won an Emmy Award for her guest portrayal of Dee Wilcox in "Sugar Mama" (1979), and Eileen Brennan was nominated for an Emmy for her guest portrayal of Mrs. McKenzie in "Thy Boss's Wife" (1981). Actresses Marcia Wallace and Penny Marshall, psychologist Dr. Joyce Brothers, cookie entrepreneur Wally "Famous" Amos, newscaster Edwin Newman, and ring announcer Jimmy Lennon portrayed themselves in separate episodes.

George Wendt and Ted Danson, who appeared in separate episodes, went on to star in primary Taxi director Jim Burrows' next series, Cheers, as did recurring Taxi performer Rhea Perlman. Tom Selleck also had a memorable guest appearance, constituting one of the memorable fares of Cab 804 (in "Memories of Cab 804: Part 2"), while Tom Hanks portrayed Reverend Jim's college roommate in the flashback episode "The Road Not Taken, Part 1".

WBC world welterweight champion Carlos Palomino appeared in the episode "One-Punch Banta" as himself (season 1, episode 2, original air date September 19, 1978). In that episode, Palomino accidentally punches Tony in the face when he failed to pull his punch. Allan Arbus, who portrayed US Army psychiatrist Dr. Sidney Freedman in M*A*S*H, played his manager in the episode. Football player-turned-actor Bubba Smith appeared in one episode. Newscaster Eric Sevareid played himself in a fantasy sequence. Martial artist and professional wrestler Gene LeBell played himself in multiple episodes as the referee for Tony Banta's boxing matches.

Episodes

Awards and nominations
Taxi is one of television's most lauded shows. During its run, the sitcom was nominated for 31 Emmy Awards and won 18, including three for Outstanding Comedy Series. It was also nominated for 25 Golden Globes, with four wins (three for Best TV Series – Musical/Comedy). In 1979, it received the Humanitas Prize in the 30 minute category. It was also ranked 48th in TV Guide's 50 Greatest TV Shows of All Time. In 1997, two of the show's episodes, "Latka the Playboy" and "Reverend Jim: A Space Odyssey" were respectively ranked #19 and #63 on TV Guide's 100 Greatest Episodes of All Time. In 2013, the series was ranked #35 on TV Guide's 60 Best Series of All Time.

Awards
Emmy Awards:
 Comedy Series (1979–1981)
 Lead Actress in a Comedy Series – Ruth Gordon (1979)
 Lead Actress in a Comedy Series – Carol Kane (1982)
 Lead Actor in a Comedy Series – Judd Hirsch (1981, 1983)
 Supporting Actress in a Comedy Series – Carol Kane (1983)
 Supporting Actor in a Comedy Series – Danny DeVito (1981)
 Supporting Actor in a Comedy Series – Christopher Lloyd (1982, 1983)
 Directing in a Comedy Series – James Burrows (1980, 1981)
 Writing in a Comedy Series – Michael J. Leeson (1981)
 Writing in a Comedy Series – Ken Estin (1982)
 Film Editing for a Series – M. Pam Blumenthal (1979–81), Jack Michon (1981)

Golden Globe Awards:
 Best Television Series-Comedy (1979–1981), tied in 1980 with Alice
 Best TV Supporting Actor – Danny DeVito (1980), tied with Vic Tayback in Alice

Additional nominations
Emmy Awards:
 Comedy Series (1982, 1983)
 Lead Actor in a Comedy Series – Judd Hirsch (1979, 1980, 1982)
 Supporting Actor in a Comedy Series – Danny DeVito (1979, 1982, 1983)
 Lead Actress in a Comedy Series – Eileen Brennan (1981)
 Directing in a Comedy Series – James Burrows (1982)
 Writing in a Comedy Series – Michael J. Leeson (1979)
 Writing in a Comedy Series – Glen Charles and Les Charles (1980, 1981)
 Writing in a Comedy Series – David Lloyd (1981)
 Writing in a Comedy Series – Barry Kemp and Holly Holmberg Brooks (1982)
 Writing in a Comedy Series – Ken Estin (1983)

Golden Globe Awards:
 Television Series-Comedy (1982–1984)
 Actor in a TV Series-Comedy – Judd Hirsch (1979–1983)
 TV Supporting Actress – Marilu Henner (1979–1983)
 TV Supporting Actress – Carol Kane (1983)
 TV Supporting Actor – Tony Danza (1980)
 TV Supporting Actor – Danny DeVito (1979, 1981, 1982)
 TV Supporting Actor – Jeff Conaway (1979, 1980)
 TV Supporting Actor – Andy Kaufman (1979, 1981)

Production
Taxi was inspired by the non-fiction article "Night-Shifting for the Hip Fleet" by Mark Jacobson, which appeared in the September 22, 1975, issue of New York magazine. This article helped suggest the idea for the show to James L. Brooks and David Davis, though nothing from the article was used directly.  The article was a profile of several drivers who worked the night shift for a New York cab company.

The series was produced on Stage 23 at Paramount Studios in Los Angeles, California, from July 5, 1978, to February 18, 1983.

When the series was cancelled by ABC, it seemed for a time that the premium cable television network HBO would pick up the series. When it did not, the series was picked up by NBC, which at first kept it on at its ABC time slot of Thursday 9:30 p.m  following the first season of Cheers. An NBC promo for Taxis move to the network featured Danny DeVito in character as Louie saying "Same time, better station!"

The taxicabs shown in the show are Checker A11s.

Opening and closing sequence
The opening titles show a Checker cab driving east across the Queensboro Bridge. The footage originally was intended as a "bridge" between scenes and is only about fifteen seconds long; parts of it are repeated to fill the opening. Driving the vehicle is cast-member Tony Danza. The closing version consisted of a cab driving into the night.

Theme music
Bob James wrote the opening theme, "Angela", which had been intended for a sequence in episode #3 ("Blind Date"). The producers liked this slower, more melancholic tune better than the up-tempo opening theme they had originally chosen ("Touchdown"), and were able to make the switch before the first episode aired.   Both songs are on James's 1978 album, Touchdown.

In 1983, James released The Genie, an LP containing much of the incidental music he had written for Taxi during its run.

Syndication
Reruns of Taxi began airing in syndication in 1983 on 64 television stations immediately after NBC cancelled the program. It has been airing in syndication every year since. The program also aired on Nick at Nite from 1994 to 2001. Taxi currently reruns Sunday nights on MeTV as part of the "Last Laughs" block. Hulu, Pluto and Amazon Prime have all the seasons, but as of February 2023, only Paramount Plus has every episode, including some available with their original music for the first time outside of the original and syndicated runs.
In the UK, Taxi aired on BBC1 with repeats airing on Paramount Comedy 2 and CBS Drama. As of 2020, the series has been airing weeknights on Decades as part of their “Smart Coms Across The Decades” block.  Decades has also aired “Taxi” as a weekend binge.

Cast reunions
Danny DeVito hosted an episode of Saturday Night Live (on NBC) soon after Taxi was canceled after the fourth season. During the opening monologue, DeVito read a letter supposedly from his mother asking God to forgive ABC for cancelling the show, adding that "but I'll understand if you don't." A filmed bit had him driving around New York looking morose until inspiration strikes, and he blows up the ABC building. In addition, the Taxi cast members were given an opportunity for closure, which up to that point had been denied for them due to the abrupt cancellation. The actors took their "final" bows during DeVito's opening monologue, only to have NBC (which aired SNL) pick up the show.

Decades later, most of the cast returned to play their younger selves and briefly re-enact scenes for the Kaufman biopic Man on the Moon. Judd Hirsch, Marilu Henner, Jeff Conaway, Carol Kane, Randall Carver, J. Alan Thomas and Christopher Lloyd all reprised their roles. The only two living members of the principal cast who did not were Danny DeVito, who produced and co-starred in the film as Kaufman's manager George Shapiro, and Tony Danza, who at the time of filming was performing in A View from the Bridge on Broadway.

Several of the cast members (along with cast members from other Judd Hirsch and Bob Newhart vehicles) reunited in different roles for an episode of the Judd Hirsch/Bob Newhart series George & Leo.

In January 2009, Danny DeVito mentioned wanting to make a Taxi reunion movie.

Home media
All five seasons of Taxi have been released from Paramount Home Entertainment. The first three seasons of Taxi were released on DVD in Region 1 between 2004 and 2005. It took almost four years until Paramount released The Fourth Season on September 22, 2009, and The (Fifth &) Final Season on December 22, 2009 (the last two seasons were released through CBS Home Entertainment). As of October 2014, all seasons have been released in Germany (Region 2).

On November 11, 2014, CBS Home Entertainment released Taxi- The Complete Series on DVD in Region 1. All 114 episodes are featured on a 17-disc collection.

Footnotes

References 
 Lovece, Frank, with Franco, Jules. Hailing Taxi: The Official Book of the Show. New York: Prentice Hall, 1988. Reissued  as Taxi: The Official Fan's Guide. New York: Citadel, 1996. . SBN-13: .

External links 

 
 
 Encyclopedia of Television
 

 
1978 American television series debuts
1983 American television series endings
1970s American sitcoms
1970s American workplace comedy television series
1980s American sitcoms
1980s American workplace comedy television series
American Broadcasting Company original programming
American television series revived after cancellation
Best Musical or Comedy Series Golden Globe winners
English-language television shows
Fictional taxi drivers
NBC original programming
Primetime Emmy Award for Outstanding Comedy Series winners
Television series by CBS Studios
Television series created by Ed. Weinberger
Television series created by James L. Brooks
Television shows set in Manhattan
Works about taxis